Pascal Chrétien (born 7 April 1968) is a French-Australian commercial helicopter pilot and engineer with degrees in electronics and aerospace who designed, built and test flew the world’s first crewed electric helicopter the Solution F/Chretien Helicopter on 12 August 2011. The helicopter, built for the French company Solution F, set a Guinness World Record and received the IDTechEx Electric Vehicles Land Sea & Air award.

Chrétien has been pioneering electromagnetic transmissions and hybrid propulsion applied to aircraft since 2002 and holds several patents in the field. Chrétien obtained commercial helicopter pilot licences in Canada and Australia, in 1993 and 1994, respectively. He has aerial work and aircraft testing experience.

References 

1968 births
Living people
French aerospace engineers
20th-century French inventors